A list of horror films released in 2008.

References

Lists of horror films by year
2008-related lists